Mispila tonkinea is a species of beetle in the family Cerambycidae. It was described by Maurice Pic in 1925, originally under the genus Alidus.

References

tonkinea
Beetles described in 1925